Shiawassee may refer to:

 Shiawassee County, Michigan
 Shiawassee Township, Michigan
 Shiawassee National Wildlife Refuge
 Shiawassee River